The University at Buffalo Libraries is the university library system of the University at Buffalo. The library's collections includes some 3.8 million print volumes, as well as media, and special collections. The Libraries subscribe to some 350 research databases and 10,000 electronic journals.

Notable collections include the George Kelley Paperback and Pulp Fiction Collection, the James Joyce Collection, the Love Canal Collections, and the Robert Graves Collection.

History
In 1922, Ruth Bartholomew was appointed as the first University Librarian. The library was originally located in Foster Hall but was moved to larger quarters in the second floor of Hayes Hall.

In 1929, Thomas B. Lockwood (1873–1947) donated $500,000 to the University of Buffalo for the construction of a library building. In the spring of 1935, the library was moved to the newly constructed Lockwood Memorial Library building. Designed by noted Buffalo architect E.B. Green and built in classic Georgian architectural style, the building was an elegant, four-story structure located at the heart of the South Campus. In addition to providing funds for the building, Lockwood also donated his personal collection of rare books.

On April 19, 1979, the new Lockwood Memorial Library was officially opened. Designed for the new campus in Amherst, the Lockwood Memorial Library name was to be placed on the new library in recognition of the original endowment established by Mr. Lockwood. The original Lockwood Memorial Library, renamed Charles D. Abbott Hall / Health Sciences Library, was renovated and enlarged in 1983–1985.

References

External links 
 University at Buffalo Libraries

University and college academic libraries in the United States
Libraries in New York (state)
Map collections
Educational institutions established in 1846
SUNY university centers
Libraries
1846 establishments in New York (state)